Armand Francois Erasmus (born 19 June 1992) is a South African cricketer. He made his first-class debut for North West in the 2011–12 CSA Provincial Three-Day Challenge on 16 February 2012. In September 2018, he was named in Easterns' squad for the 2018 Africa T20 Cup. In September 2019, he was named in Easterns' squad for the 2019–20 CSA Provincial T20 Cup.

References

External links
 

1992 births
Living people
South African cricketers
North West cricketers
Easterns cricketers
People from Brakpan
Sportspeople from Gauteng